Crossen may refer to:

Crossen an der Elster, municipality in Thuringia, Germany
Zwickau-Crossen, part of Zwickau in Saxony, Germany
Crossen (Oder), German name of Krosno Odrzańskie, Poland
part of the municipality Erlau in Saxony, Germany
Kendell Foster Crossen, detective story author
Crossens, a district of Southport

See also
Krossen
Krosno